Duygun Yarsuvat (18 August 1937 – 10 September 2021) was a Turkish lawyer and former chairman of Galatasaray.

Biography
Yarsuvat graduated from Galatasaray High School in 1957. He then studied law at Istanbul University and graduated in 1961.

Death
On 10 September 2021, Yarsuvat died in the hospital in Istanbul, where he was being treated for an illness.

Galatasaray
On 25 October 2014, Yarsuvat replaced Ünal Aysal to become the 35th president of Galatasaray, winning 1777 of the 3379 votes cast.

Trophies won by club during presidency

Football
 Süper Lig: 2014–15
 Turkish Cup: 2014–15

Women's Basketball
 Turkish Women's Basketball League: 2014-2015

See also
 List of Galatasaray S.K. presidents

References

1937 births
2021 deaths
Lawyers from Istanbul
Galatasaray S.K. presidents
Galatasaray High School alumni
Istanbul University Faculty of Law alumni